Roo Rogers (born January 1975) is a British-American entrepreneur, business designer and author based out of London. 

Rogers is currently the CEO of Johannesburg-based venture development company Founders Factory Africa.

Early life and education
Rogers was born in January 1975 to his parents Richard Rogers, architect, and Ruth Rogers, chef and restaurateur of The River Café London (from 1996, Lord and Lady Rogers). He received his B.A. from Columbia College and his Masters in Development Economics from University College London.

Career
In 2013, Rogers was a partner at fuseproject.

While at fuseproject, Rogers launched a business-accelerator named SPRING.

Rogers partnered with Growth Africa, the African Enterprise Collective, LUMS Centre for Entrepreneurship and the Pakistan National Incubation Center to lead the delivery across all stages. From the selection of grass-roots entrepreneurs and start-ups, such as Dot & Line, SABAQ, EdKASA and EarthEnable, to the design of new methodology and content that he and his team used to accelerate the ventures. Rogers and his team also trained HCD (Human-Centred Design) moderators and researchers in countries across Africa and Asia to enable rapid testing with users and prototyping.

In 2007, Rogers, with his wife Bernardine Huang, co-founded OZOLab a venture company that invests in ecological-minded businesses and patented products such as OZOwater (with Jordan Harris). In 2005, the first OZOLab venture, OZOcar, was launched. Operating as a kinder, gentler car service option, OZOcar used environmentally-conscious vehicles and was sold in 2014 to FCS. Rogers was also president of RedScout Ventures from 2009 until June 2012.

As of October 2018, Rogers is the CEO of venture development company Founders Factory Africa. Locally rooted and globally connected, Founders Factory Africa aims to be the best innovation partner for startups across the African continent. With £20m raised in funding from corporate partners, Standard Bank Group and Netcare, Founders Factory Africa are able to successfully support tech-enabled businesses through an aggressive growth strategy across product development, UX/UI, data science, engineering, business development and growth marketing, strategic partnerships, as well as an additional financial cash injection. Through this exceptional and bespoke approach, the venture development company aims to build and scale 140 startups across all 54 countries in Africa over the next 5 years.

Media
Rogers is also an active writer and commentator on the sharing economy. He co-authored What's Mine Is Yours: The Rise of Collaborative Consumption in 2010 with Rachel Botsman, which analyzes the rise of the collaborative consumption movement and explores the impact of the movement on individuals, communities and business models. In 2004, he founded we:nited magazine, a non-profit magazine and blog targeted towards young people in conjunction with the 2004 US Presidential Elections.

Rogers co-founded Drive Thru Pictures and Drive Thru Films in 2000, with the companies producing documentaries about political and social issues aimed at youth audiences. In the early 2000s, Drive Thru Pictures was one of the largest television companies in the UK, with clients such as BBC, MTV and The Rolling Stones. Rogers was the executive producer of the 2006 documentary Office Tigers and 2008's The Biggest Chinese Restaurant in the World, which received harsh criticism for the way in which the Tigers were treated prior to slaughter and cooking.  In 2009, he also starred in a Metamucil advertisement for which he won an award.

Personal life
Rogers lives in London with his wife Bernie, and their three children.

References

External links

1975 births
Living people
Writers from New York City
Columbia College (New York) alumni
Alumni of University College London
British businesspeople
Sons of life peers
Rogers family